Ausma is a Latvian given name, borne by over 4000 individuals in Latvia.  Its name day is June 26.

Notable people named Ausma 

Ausma Derkēvica (1929–2011), Latvian choir conductor
Ausma Kantāne-Ziedone (born 1941), Latvian actress and politician
Ausma Zehanat Khan, Canadian novelist

References 

Latvian feminine given names
Given names
Feminine given names